NET Ministries, also simply known as NET USA or NET (National Evangelization Teams) is a Catholic youth missionary organization.

History 

NET Ministries was founded in the United States and is based in Saint Paul, Minnesota in the Archdiocese of St. Paul and Minneapolis. NET's roots go back to the St. Paul Catholic Youth Center (CYC) which offered a variety of programs from 1939 to 1989.

In 1980, NET's founder Mark Berchem, through CYC, organized eighteen high school youth retreats around southern Minnesota. Young adults traveled in a van giving these retreats over a three-week period in January. The following January three teams of youth were sent to Winona, Minnesota, Fargo, North Dakota, and Sioux Falls, South Dakota.  In 1981 these missions extended to a full year commitment.  In 1982 the acronym NET (standing for National Evangelization Team) became name of this movement, inspired by Mark 1:17 and Luke 5:4.

These developments were centred around the Catholic Charismatic covenant community 'Christ the Redeemer' (a member of the Sword of the Spirit association of covenant communities) where NET board member Jim Kolar works as coordinator.

CYC closed in 1989 and NET was incorporated as a nonprofit corporation under the Archbishop of St. Paul and Minneapolis.

NET in other countries 
In 1988, NET Ministries expanded to Australia, and to Canada in 1994. NET Australia and NET Canada are now separate organizations. In 2004, NET Uganda started as an offshoot of NET Australia, and NET Canada started a sister organization in Ireland. NET Scotland is currently run through NET USA.

Programs 

Each year, around 180 young Catholics from ages 18–28 are accepted to be "netters" for the year. After a four-week training, they are divided into around sixteen teams of 8-15 members. Each team is either a "retreat team" or a "discipleship team." Retreat teams travel around the United States in a van with a trailer, conducting retreats and parishes and schools. Discipleship teams are based at a parish or school and stay there the entire year serving the local parish community.

Notable alumni 

 Bishop Andrew H. Cozzens
Bishop Scott McCaig

See also

Sword of the Spirit
Catholic spirituality
Fellowship of Catholic University Students
Life Teen
Universal call to holiness
Vocational Discernment in the Catholic Church
World Youth Day

References

External links 
NET USA

Catholic lay organisations
Catholic youth organizations
Organizations based in Minnesota
Non-profit organisations based in Australia
Non-profit organizations based in Canada
Non-profit organizations based in the United States
Catholic organizations